Andrew Wilson (born 13 December 1975) is a Maltese windsurfer. He competed in the men's Mistral One Design event at the 1996 Summer Olympics.

References

External links
 

1975 births
Living people
Maltese windsurfers
Maltese male sailors (sport)
Olympic sailors of Malta
Sailors at the 1996 Summer Olympics – Mistral One Design
Place of birth missing (living people)